Special Delivery is a 2000 television film directed by Mark Jean and starring Andy Dick. It premiered on Fox Family on their 25 Days of Christmas programming block.

Premise
A bumbling courier at a private adoption agency botches the delivery of a baby to its new parents in time for Christmas when he misplaces their baby en route.

Cast
Andy Dick as Lloyd Stedman
David Lewis as Jack Beck
Megan Leitch as Robin Beck
Jodelle Ferland as Samantha Beck
Ralph Alderman as Sarge Reilly
Nels Lennarson as Customs Officer
Donna White as Vera Reilly
Kevin McNulty as Fred Anders (as Kevin Mcnulty)
Jennifer Clement as Judy
Greg Rogers as Charlie Zwick
Ken Camroux as Lawrence Beck
Rebecca Toolan as Virginia Beck
Jocelyne Loewen as Ashley
Davis Poon as Beck Baby
Victoria Poon as Beck Baby

Reception
Raggle Fraggle Reviews criticized almost every aspect of the film and concluded: "The film is not funny at all, a lot of the comedy relies on the comedic  of slap stick and  just awful, the jokes are really badly paced and a lot of the time they are either really over the top or extremely unrealistic."

See also
 List of Christmas films

References

External links
 

2000 television films
2000 films
2000s Christmas films
American Christmas films
ABC Family original films
Christmas television films
Films with screenplays by Steven Kampmann
Films directed by Mark Jean
2000s English-language films